Kan Wencong is a retired professional wushu taolu athlete from China. She is a two-time world champion, double gold medalist at the Asian Games, and a one-time Asian junior champion.

See also 

 List of Asian Games medalists in wushu

References 

1992 births
Living people
People from Cangzhou
Chinese wushu practitioners
Lanzhou University alumni
Wushu practitioners at the 2010 Asian Games
Wushu practitioners at the 2014 Asian Games
Asian Games gold medalists for China
Asian Games medalists in wushu
Medalists at the 2010 Asian Games
Medalists at the 2014 Asian Games